Anne Wienholt (1920-2018) was an Australian artist known for her printmaking, sculpture, and painting.

Biography
Wienholt was born in Leura, New South Wales on 10 April 1920. She attended East Sydney Technical College from 1938 through 1941 where she was taught by William Dobell and Frank Medworth.

In the early 1940s Wienholt exhibited at the Macquarie Galleries and the Victoria Contemporary Art Society Show. She was also associated with the Merioola Group.

Wienholt was the recipient of the New South Wales Travelling Art Scholarship in 1944, which she used to travel to New York City, first studying at the Art Students League of New York with Yasuo Kuniyoshi, then at Atelier 17. In 1948, 1949, and 1950 she participated in the Brooklyn Museum’s National Print Annual Exhibition.

In 1948 she married Masato Takashige, a Japanese born cabinetmaker. The couple lived in Marin County, California.

Wienholt died in San Rafael, California on 27 March 2018. In 2019 a retrospective of her work was held at the College of Marin Fine Arts Gallery. Her work is in the collection of the National Gallery of Australia and the Art Gallery of New South Wales.

References

External links
images of Wienholt's work on MutualArt
timeline and list of exhibitions from the Robin Gibson Gallery

1920 births
2018 deaths
20th-century Australian women artists
20th-century Australian artists
21st-century Australian women artists
21st-century Australian artists
Australian printmakers
Atelier 17 alumni
Art Students League of New York alumni